= Self-determination in Health Care (book) =

2020 book by Leroy C. Edozien

- Cover
- Author: Leroy C. Edozien
- Original title: Self-determination in Health Care: A Property Approach to the Protection of Patients' Rights
- Language: English
- Subject: Self-Determination, consent, healthcare law
- Genre: Non-fiction
- Publisher: Routledge
- Publication date: June 30, 2020
- Publication place: United Kingdom
- Pages: 304
- ISBN: 9780367598846

Self-determination in Health Care: A Property Approach to the Protection of Patients' Rights is a book by consultant obstetrician/gynecologist and professor of health law and policy, Leroy C. Edozien. It was first published in 2015 by Ashgate Publishing and then in 2016 by Routledge.

== Summary ==
Edozien challenges the widely accepted method of securing a patient's self-determination: securing their consent. He argues against it while presenting an alternative property model, where a patient's body and its integrity must be protected from invasions, and where the right of a patient's to access to comprehensible information upon which a rational decision can be made is considered a property right. Edozien's alternative property model is based on four pillars: the patient's right to self-determination, the patient's property rights (namely their right to bodily integrity, to involvement in decision-making in treatment), the doctor's fiduciary duty to help the patient make an informed decision by providing relevant and comprehensible information through a transactional process, and a bilateral distribution of responsibilities between the two actors. The book consists of an introduction, eight core chapters, and a conclusion.

== Reception ==
In his review, Massimiliano Colluci (Note: From the San Bortolo Hospital (Vicenza, Italy)) considered the book to be a valuable attempt at reevaluating the consent process within a new legal framework. Colluci appreciated the proposed property model's focus on protecting patient self-determination and its four key elements. Still, he noted certain weaknesses which had been acknowledged by Edozien himself in the book, such as the exclusion of cognitive and emotional aspects in decision-making, and the book's limited applicability to non-Anglo-centric legal systems. Colluci suggested the model may seem unbalanced as it concentrates on patient rights without addressing potential rights or duties of doctors. (Note: Though Edozien's alternative property model is based on four pillars: the patient's right to self-determination, the patient's property rights (namely their right to bodily integrity, to involvement in decision-making in treatment), the doctor's fiduciary duty to help the patient make an informed decision by providing relevant and comprehensible information through a transactional process, and a bilateral distribution of responsibilities between the two actors.) He questioned whether a new legal model is necessary or if improving the culture of doctor-patient relationships should take precedence for effective communication in healthcare.

Mark Cornock of The Open University praised the book's comprehensive coverage of consent, paternalism, and the right to self-determination, considering Edozien's argument for a new model. While he noted bias towards the need for a new model, Cornock commended Edozien for handling the argument illuminatingly, addressing legal, ethical, and practical aspects of the consent model in healthcare. However, Cornock expressed reservations about the lack of practical details on how the proposed property model would operate in the legal system and courts. Despite this, he recommended the book for its valuable insights into patient involvement, clinical decision-making, and its contribution to the ongoing debate on consent in healthcare. Cornock saw the journey through the book as enjoyable, interesting, and fruitful, even if the destination (the need for a new model) is not universally agreed upon.

Cassie Hopkins (Note: From the University of Liverpool) found the book to be a comprehensive and compelling piece of original research. She commended Edozien's argument against the adequacy of the consent model in medical law and ethics, favoring the author's proposed property model for protecting patients' rights. Hopkins noted the book's accessibility and structure, though she mentioned that Edozien's original contribution to the literature appears relatively late in the text. She found Edozien's alternative approach interesting and principled, addressing some of the shortcomings of the consent model. Nevertheless, she expressed concerns about the practicality of implementing a proprietary approach in healthcare, particularly in resource-intensive Western healthcare systems, and suggested that the critique of the consent model might not justify the drastic reform proposed by Edozien. Despite this, Hopkins acknowledged the book's contribution to calls for reform in the field.
